Marin Bolocan (9 August 1937 - 6 January 2015) was a Romanian wrestler. He competed in the men's Greco-Roman featherweight at the 1964 Summer Olympics.

References

1937 births
2015 deaths
Romanian male sport wrestlers
Olympic wrestlers of Romania
Wrestlers at the 1964 Summer Olympics
Place of birth missing